Cancio is both a given name and a surname. Notable people with the name include:

People with the given name
Cancio Garcia (1937-2013), Filipino lawyer and jurist

People with the surname
Hiram Rafael Cancio (1920-2008), American judge
Hugo Cancio (born 1964), Cuban-born American businessman and political activist
Leopoldo Cancio (1858-1927), Cuban politician and economist
Raúl Cancio (1911-1961), Spanish actor